Kis Se Kahoon (Urdu:کس سے کہوں) also known as Kis Se Kahoon - Ek Kahani Unsuni is a 2014 youth-based Pakistani television series that aired on PTV Home. The series was written by Shahid Nadeem, directed by Kashif Nisar and produced by Pakistan Television Corporation in collaboration with Communications Research Strategies. It stars an ensemble cast of Sajal Aly, Agha Ali, Yumna Zaidi, Essa Chaudhary and Seemi Raheel along with Samina Ahmad in a special appearance. It was aired every Sunday on PTV Home from 2014 to 2015.

Synopsis 
In the two classes of our society, rich parents focus on their own and their children's other needs while poor parents focus on their own and their children's basic needs. Both of them has no time for their children which has become a major problem in both the classes due to which the youth entering adolescence suffer not only from bad company but also from various diseases.

Plot 
Hadiqa (Sajal Aly) is the daughter of Mr. and Mrs. Qureshi (Mohsin Gilani and Seemi Raheel) who lives with her mother and daughter in a village of Northern region while her father, Mr. Qureshi works in Saudi Arabia. Hadiqa's grandmother (Samina Ahmed) raises him herself she learns a lot and simplicity and self-confidence become a part of her life in that small village. However, her life changes when she returns to the city with her parents and is admitted to an educational institution. There, Hadiqa impresses her fellow students with her self-confidence and makes many good friends, and there she meets Fahad Iqbal (Agha Ali), the beacon of a wealthy family and he has no respect for girls while the person who goes beyond me also loses it. And that's why after losing to Hadiqa in a basketball match, Fahad bets his friends to humiliate Hadiqa in every possible way. And later, because of her simplicity, Hadiqa falls into the trap of Fahd's friendship and he later uses this friendship for his nefarious purposes through the internet.

The main character of the play is also the daughter of Hadiqa's maid Salma (Yumna Zaidi) who becomes the friend of Hadiqa and Hadiqa, who is himself surrounded by troubles, also tries to improve Salma's life.

Cast
Sajal Aly as Hadiqa Qureshi
Agha Ali as Fahad Iqbal
Yumna Zaidi as Salma
Mohsin Gillani as Mr. Qureshi
Seemi Raheel as Mrs. Qureshi
Iftikhar Thakur as Salma's father
Samina Ahmad as Hadiqa's grandmother: Special appearance
Aqdas Waseem as Akbar
Essa Chaudhary

References

Pakistan Television Corporation original programming
2014 Pakistani television series debuts
2015 Pakistani television series endings
Urdu-language television shows
Pakistani television series
Pakistani drama television series